Tabernaemontana heterophylla is a species of plant in the family Apocynaceae. It is found in southeastern Central America, and northern and central South America.

References

heterophylla